Langdenia is a genus of prehistoric lobe-finned fish.

References 

Prehistoric lobe-finned fish genera